Pir Deh (also Romanized as Pīr Deh; also known as Pirdekh) is a village in Pir Bazar Rural District, in the Central District of Rasht County, Gilan Province, Iran. At the 2006 census, its population was 517, in 131 families.

References 

Populated places in Rasht County